Raciel López Salazar is a Mexican politician affiliated with the PVEM. He served as Deputy of the LXII Legislature of the Mexican Congress representing Chiapas between 2012 and 2013.

References

Year of birth missing (living people)
Living people
Politicians from Chiapas
Ecologist Green Party of Mexico politicians
21st-century Mexican politicians
National Autonomous University of Mexico alumni
People from Tonalá, Chiapas
Deputies of the LXII Legislature of Mexico
Members of the Chamber of Deputies (Mexico) for Chiapas